Moechotypa is a genus of longhorn beetles of the subfamily Lamiinae.

 Moechotypa adusta Pascoe, 1869
 Moechotypa alboannulata Pic, 1934
 Moechotypa asiatica (Pic, 1903)
 Moechotypa assamensis Breuning, 1936 inq.
 Moechotypa attenuata Pic, 1934
 Moechotypa ceylonica Breuning, 1938
 Moechotypa coomani Pic, 1934
 Moechotypa dalatensis Breuning, 1968
 Moechotypa delicatula (White, 1858)
 Moechotypa diphysis (Pascoe, 1871)
 Moechotypa formosana (Pic, 1917)
 Moechotypa javana Schwarzer, 1929
 Moechotypa jeanvoinei Pic, 1934
 Moechotypa marmorea Pascoe, 1864
 Moechotypa paraformosana Breuning, 1979
 Moechotypa penangensis Breuning, 1973
 Moechotypa semenovi Heyrovsky, 1934
 Moechotypa sikkimensis Breuning, 1936
 Moechotypa strandi Breuning, 1936
 Moechotypa suffusa (Pascoe, 1862)
 Moechotypa thoracica (White, 1858)
 Moechotypa trifasciculata Breuning, 1936
 Moechotypa umbrosa Lacordaire, 1872
 Moechotypa uniformis (Pic, 1922)

References

 
Crossotini